Kevin Raper (born January 17, 1964) is an American Republican politician who is the representative for the 24th District of the Tennessee House of Representatives. This district includes the city of Cleveland and parts of unincorporated Bradley County.

Biography
Kevin Raper is a 1982 graduate of McMinn Central High School. He received a Bachelor of Science degree in mathematics education from the University of Tennessee in 1987, a Master of Education degree from Tusculum University in 1996, and an education specialist degree from Tennessee Tech in 1997. He is a retired educator.

Raper first ran for District 7 Seat A on the Bradley County Commission in 2018, which was being vacated by Mark Hall, who successfully ran for State House District 24. He won the May 1 primary against Republican Josh Rogers with 1,110 votes, or 62.5% of the votes. He went on to win the general election on August 7, defeating Democrat Tammy Davis with 1,699 votes, or 72.2%. In 2019, Raper voted for a controversial property tax increase, as well as to override Bradley County Mayor Gary Davis's veto of the increase. He was also one of the strongest backers of a county-funded study on the feasibility of expanding sewers into unincorporated parts of Bradley County, which critics charged was unnecessary and being undertaken to financially benefit the local homebuilding industry. 

Raper announced his intent to run for the 24th District seat in the Tennessee House of Representatives on November 10, 2021, after incumbent Mark Hall announced his intent to run for the Tennessee Senate. He won the August 4, 2022, primary with 2,107 votes, or 38.7% of the vote against three primary opponents. He faced no Democratic opponent in the general election on November 8.

Personal life
Raper is married and has two sons. He is a Baptist, and a member of the Sons of the American Revolution.

Political views
Raper has stated that he believes that abortion should always be illegal except for when necessary to save the lives of pregnant women. He also described critical race theory as "divisive and racially motivated".

References

Tennessee Republicans
Living people

Year of birth missing (living people)
21st-century American politicians
1964 births
University of Tennessee alumni
Tusculum University alumni
Tennessee Technological University alumni
People from McMinn County, Tennessee
People from Cleveland, Tennessee
Republican Party members of the Tennessee House of Representatives